Coleophora fiorii is a moth of the family Coleophoridae. It is found in Spain and Italy.

References

fiorii
Moths described in 1954
Moths of Europe